The Baptistery of Albenga is a paleochristian religious structure in Albenga,  province of Savona, in the region of Liguria of northern Italy. It is an example of 5th-century late-Ancient Roman architecture with mosaic decoration, and stands adjacent to the Albenga Cathedral of San Michele Arcangelo.

Description
Inscriptions date construction to the 5th century under a Flavio Costanzo. The layout is that of a decagon with an octagonal drum. The building still retains an octagonal baptismal font and 6th century mosaics with allegorical symbols of Christ such as the Labarum (Chi - Rho) and the Alpha and Omega. The walls have traces of 15th-century frescoes. The interior houses two Lombard burial monuments. The original foundations are lower than the present one. The roof was remodeled and replaced in 1898 by a wooden structure. The baptistery is now part of the town Museo Diocesano

The niche with late-Roman Empire Christian mosaics depicts an Alpha-Omega within three concentric circles symbolizing the Trinity, and surrounded by 12 doves symbolizing the apostles who disseminated the teachings under the guidance of the Holy Spirit. Finally two sheep stand in a field around a cross. The Latin inscription of the arch recalls relics held in the church.

See also
History of medieval Arabic and Western European domes

References

External links 

Churches in the province of Savona
5th-century churches
Palaeo-Christian architecture in Italy
Romanesque architecture in Liguria
Early Christian art
Albenga
Baptisteries in Italy